Bowen University is a private Baptist Christian Nigerian university located at Iwo in Osun State, Nigeria, and is housed in the old 1,300-acre (6 km²) campus of the Baptist College, a teacher-training institution on a hill just outside the city. It is affiliated with the Nigerian Baptist Convention.

History
The University was founded on 17 July 2001 by the Nigerian Baptist Convention. The Federal Government of Nigeria approved the establishment of the university and it was subsequently licensed to operate by the National Universities Commission. A Provisional Governing Council was inaugurated on 22 August 2001, with Professor J.T. Okedara as Vice Chancellor and Mr E. A. Lawale as Registrar. Academic activity started on 4 November 2002, with 500 students admitted into the Faculties of Agriculture, Science, Science Education, and Social and Management Sciences. In 2017, it would have 5,000 students. In 2018, the university launched a radio station.

Faculties and courses offered in Bowen University 
Faculties

College of Agriculture, Engineering and Science (COAES)

College of Management and Social Sciences (COMSS)

College of Law (COLAW)

College of Health Sciences (COHES)

College of Liberal Studies (COLBS)

ollege of Computing and Communication Studies (COCCS)

College of Environmental Sciences (COEVS)

College of Agriculture, Engineering and Science (COAES)

B.Sc. Microbiology

B.Sc. Pure and Applied Biology

B.Sc. Biochemistry

B.Sc. Industrial Chemistry

B.Sc. Mathematics

B.Sc. Statistics

B.Sc. Physics

Bachelor of Agriculture (B.Agric.)

B.Sc. Food Science and Technology

B.Eng. Electrical/Electronics Engineering

B.Eng. Mechatronics Engineering

B. Agric. Extension and Social Engineering (SAFE)

College of Management and Social Sciences (COMSS)

B.Sc. Accounting

B.Sc. Banking and Finance

B.Sc. Business Administration

B.Sc. Industrial Relations and Personnel Management

B.Sc. Economics

B.Sc. Sociology

B.Sc. Political Science

B.Sc. International Relations

B.Sc. Political and Law 

College of Law (COLAW)

Bachelor of Laws (LL.B.)

College of Liberal Studies (COLBS)

B.A. Music

B.A. Theatre Arts

B.A. English

B.A. History and International Studies

B.A. Religious Studies

Notable people

Alumni of the college include:
Bukky Abaniwonda, Canadian actress of Nigerian descent.

Gallery

References

External links

 

2001 establishments in Nigeria
Educational institutions established in 2001
Christian universities and colleges in Nigeria
Osun State
Baptist universities and colleges
Baptist Christianity in Nigeria